Arkay College of Engineering and Technology is a private engineering college established in 1999 in Bodhan town of Nizamabad district, Telangana state, India. The college is located 25 kilometres west of district headquarters, Nizamabad. It is a Muslim Minority college affiliated to JNTU Hyderabad and approved by AICTE, New Delhi.

Academics

The college admits undergraduate students through the statewide EAMCET exam conducted every year. It offers B.Tech & M.Tech courses.

Departments

 Civil Engineering
 Mechanical Engineering
 Electronics and Communication Engineering
 Electrical and Electronics Engineering
 Computer Science Engineering
 Information Technology
 Automobile Engineering

Intake
Diploma 

UG 

PG

See also
Vijay Rural Engineering College
List of educational institutions in Nizamabad
Education in India
Literacy in India
List of institutions of higher education in Telangana

References

External links
Official Website

Engineering colleges in Telangana
Nizamabad district
1999 establishments in Andhra Pradesh
Educational institutions established in 1999